Raj Bhavan, Chandigarh may refer to:

 Raj Bhavan, Haryana, official residence of the governor of Haryana, located in Chandigarh.
 Raj Bhavan, Punjab, official residence of the governor of Punjab, located in Chandigarh.